Park Hyuk-soon (born March 6, 1980) is a South Korean football player who since 2009 has played for Busan Transportation Corporation. His father Park Sang-in and his brother Park Seung-min are also footballers.

Club career 
He played in K League for the Anyang LG Cheetahs, Incheon United, Gwangju Sangmu and Gyeongnam FC from 2003 through 2008.

External links 

Park Hyuk-soon at n-league.net

1980 births
Living people
South Korean footballers
FC Seoul players
FC Seoul non-playing staff
FC Seoul managers
Incheon United FC players
Gimcheon Sangmu FC players
Gyeongnam FC players
K League 1 players
Korea National League players
Yonsei University alumni
Association football midfielders
South Korean football managers